Châteaurenault may refer to:
François Louis Rousselet de Châteaurenault (1637–1716), French admiral and marshal
French ship Châteaurenault, several French naval vessels named after the admiral
Château-Renault, a commune in Indre-et-Loire, France